Esko Tapani Rechardt (born 9 May 1958 in Helsinki) is a Finnish sailor and Olympic champion. He won a gold medal in the Finn Class at the 1980 Summer Olympics in Moscow.

He sailed on Martela OF during the 1989–90 Whitbread Round the World Race.

Biography
Rechardt has a master's degree in engineering, and after his sporting career has designed bridges, such as the bridge connecting the Korkeasaari zoo to Helsinki mainland.

References

External links
 
 

1958 births
Living people
Finnish male sailors (sport)
Olympic sailors of Finland
Olympic gold medalists for Finland
Olympic medalists in sailing
Sailors at the 1980 Summer Olympics – Finn
Sailors at the 1984 Summer Olympics – Finn
Medalists at the 1980 Summer Olympics
Volvo Ocean Race sailors
20th-century Finnish people
Sportspeople from Helsinki